Thomas James Mulvany (1779–1845) was an Irish painter and keeper of the Royal Hibernian Academy.

Life
Mulvany was an exhibitor with the Dublin Society of Artists, at the rooms of the Dublin Society in Hawkins Street, Dublin, in May 1809. When the Dublin Society in 1819 disposed of their premises and the artists were left without a place for exhibition, Mulvany, with his brother, John George Mulvany, also a painter, was active in advocating for a charter of incorporation to the artists of Ireland. A charter was obtained in 1823 and the Royal Hibernian Academy founded under the presidency of Francis Johnston; Mulvany and his brother were two of the 14 academicians first elected.

Subsequently Mulvany became keeper of the Academy, in 1841. He died in 1845.

Works

Mulvany wrote for The Citizen on Irish artists. During the last years of his life Mulvany was employed in editing the Life of James Gandon. The book was published in 1846. It was based on papers of James Gandon the younger, and Maurice James Craig also edited the work.

Family
Mulvany married Mary Field, and they had seven children, the eldest being William Thomas Mulvany. Their son George Francis Mulvany (1809–1869), also practised as a painter. He succeeded his father as keeper of the Royal Hibernian Academy, and in 1854 he was elected the first director of the newly founded National Gallery of Ireland. The fourth son John Skipton Mulvany was known as an architect.

Notes

 
Attribution
 

1779 births
1845 deaths
19th-century Irish painters
Irish male painters
Irish biographers
Irish male non-fiction writers
Irish male writers
Male biographers
19th-century Irish writers
19th-century male writers
19th-century Irish male artists